Huoying, Huo-ying, or Huo Ying, may refer to:
 Huoying station, a Beijing Subway station
 Huoying Subdistrict, a township-level division of Beijing
 Huo Ying, politician for Guizhou at the 11th National People's Congress
 Huo-Ying Jian-Cha-Zhe, a UAV from GYBC UAV

See also
 Huo
 Li Huo-Ying, a character in Borrow Your Love
 Ying (disambiguation)
 Ying Huo (disambiguation)